HMCS Fundy (hull number MCB 145) was a  that was constructed for the Royal Canadian Navy during the Cold War. The minesweeper entered service in March 1954 and was transferred later that month to the French Navy. Renamed La Dunkerquoise, the ship was converted to a territorial patrol vessel in 1973 and remained in service until 1984. La Dunkerquoise was discarded in 1986.

Design and description
The Bay class were designed and ordered as replacements for the Second World War-era minesweepers that the Royal Canadian Navy operated at the time.

They had a complement of 38 officers and ratings.

The Bay-class minesweepers were powered by two GM 12-cylinder diesel engines driving two shafts creating . The ships were armed with one 40 mm Bofors gun and were equipped with minesweeping gear.

Operational history
The ship's keel was laid down on 19 June 1951 by Saint John Shipbuilding at their yard in Saint John, New Brunswick. Named for a bay located between New Brunswick and Nova Scotia, Fundy was launched on 9 December 1953. The ship was commissioned on 19 March 1954.

Fundy remained in Canadian service for only a few weeks as the vessel was paid off on 31 March 1954. The minesweeper was transferred to the French Navy the same day and renamed La Dunkerquoise. The ship was commissioned into the French Navy on 21 May 1954. She served as a minesweeper until 1973 when the minesweeping gear was removed and La Dunkerquoise transferred to the Pacific Ocean for duty as an overseas territories patrol vessel. The vessel remained in service until 1984 and was paid off on 15 October 1986. The ship was stricken in 1986.

References

Notes

Citations

References
 
 
 
 
 

 

Bay-class minesweepers
Bay-class minesweepers of the French Navy
Ships built in New Brunswick
1953 ships
Cold War minesweepers of Canada
Cold War minesweepers of France
Minesweepers of the Royal Canadian Navy